The 1981–82 season is Real Madrid Club de Fútbol's 80th season in existence and the club's 51st consecutive season in the top flight of Spanish football.

Summary
Owing to financial issues, President Luis de Carlos, for the second consecutive summer, chose not to reinforce the club for the campaign with high-profile players and on 6 September 1981 announced his candidacy for seeking reelection as president. After struggling the first half of the League season trailing behind FC Barcelona and Real Sociedad, Boskov managed the squad to the first spot briefly during January. Then, the team collapsed in the League table during February with a bad series of results included six matches without victory. Finally, Boskov left the club on 29 March 1982 being replaced by Luis Molowny for the last four rounds finishing on the 3rd place three points below back-to-back Champions Real Sociedad .
In UEFA Cup the club could won the series against Tatabányai in First Round, Carl Zeiss Jena in Second Round and Rapid Wien in Eightfinals. Then, in Quarterfinals was eliminated by Western German side FC Kaiserslautern in spite of having won 3–1 the first match of the series for the second leg the squad was defeated with a massive 0–5 score. The result shattered the chances of Boskov to remain as head coach for the next year.

In Copa del Rey the squad reached the 1982 Copa del Rey Final and won the trophy after defeating Sporting Gijón 2–1 at Estadio José Zorrilla in front of 30,000 spectators. It was the last cup and season of a short period through the club history known as "Madrid of Los García (1978–82)", seven players with surname "García" were registered to the squad for this campaign.

Squad

Transfers

Competitions

Primera Division

Position by round

League table

Matches

Copa del Rey

Eightfinals

Quarter-finals

Semi-finals

Final

UEFA Cup

Second round

Eightfinals

Quarterfinals

Statistics

Players statistics

See also
The Madrid of los Garcia (in Spanish)

References

External links
 BDFútbol

Real Madrid CF seasons
Real Madrid